Vincerò ("I will be victorious") is the concluding cry of the aria "Nessun dorma" from Puccini's opera Turandot.

Vincerò may also refer to:

Music

Albums
 Vincerò, greatest hits compilation album by Luciano Pavarotti
 Vincerò, album by Amaury Vassili

Songs
 "Vincerò", song by Davide Esposito from Vassili's album
 "Vincerò", hit song by Fredrik Kempe (2002) mixing opera and disco
 "Vincerò", song and EP by Norimasa Fujisawa (2008)
 "Vincerò", song by Annalisa from the album Splende (2015)
 "Vincerò, Perderò", song by Mario Frangoulis